Cecília Dassi (born December 6, 1989, in Esteio, Rio Grande do Sul) is a Brazilian retired actress famous for her work on Rede Globo soap operas.

Career

On television

As actress
Soap operas
1997 - Por Amor .... Sandra/Sandrinha (supporting actress)
1999 - Suave Veneno .... Patrícia/Patty (supporting actress)
2001 - A Padroeira .... Zoé (supporting actress)
2002 - O Beijo do Vampiro .... Beatriz/Bia (supporting actress)
2005 - Alma Gêmea .... Mirella (supporting actress)
2007 - Sete Pecados .... Estela (supporting actress)
2008 - Três Irmãs .... Natália (supporting actress)
2009 - Viver a Vida .... Clarissa (supporting actress)

Miniseries
2002 - O Quinto dos Infernos .... princess Maria da Glória (supporting actress)

Various
1996 - A Comédia da Vida Privada - episode: Parece que foi ontem
1996 - Você Decide - episode: Um mundo cão (protagonist)
2000 - Bambuluá .... Gute
2000 - Milênio: Show da Virada - special participation

As presenter
2004/2005 - TV Globinho

On cinema
2008 - A Guerra dos Rochas .... Bebel

In theater
2003 - Branca de Neve .... Branca de Neve
2004 - Com Brinquedo só se Brinca

Awards and nominations
Awards
Prêmio Contigo!
1998 - Best child actress, for Por Amor.
2003 - Best child actress, for O Beijo do Vampiro.
Prêmio FestNatal
1997 - Most promising actress, for Por Amor.
Prêmio Master
1997 - Most promising actress, for Por Amor.
Troféu APCA
1997 - Most promising newcomer, for Por Amor.

Nominations
Prêmio Contigo!
2006 - Best child actress, for Alma Gêmea.
Troféu Imprensa
1997 - Revelation of the year, for Por Amor.

References

Bibliography

External links

Official site 

1989 births
Brazilian film actresses
Brazilian stage actresses
Brazilian telenovela actresses
Brazilian television actresses
Brazilian people of Italian descent
Living people
People from Rio Grande do Sul